Chloe Auliʻi Cravalho (born November 22, 2000) is an American actress and singer who made her acting debut as the voice of the titular character in the 2016 Disney 3D computer-animated musical feature film Moana. She went on to star in the NBC drama series Rise (2018), the Netflix drama film All Together Now (2020) and the Hulu romantic comedy Crush (2022).

Early life 
Cravalho was born in Kohala, Hawaii, to Cathleen Puanani Cravalho and Dwayne Cravalho. She is of Native Hawaiian, Puerto Rican, Portuguese, Chinese, and Irish descent. At the time she made her breakthrough, she was living in Mililani, Hawaii, with her mother and was in her freshman year of high school, singing soprano in the glee club at Kamehameha Schools' Kapālama campus.

Career 
Cravalho has stated that she was initially not going to audition for Moana because "there were already so many great submissions that I didn't think I needed to try out". However, an Oahu talent agent discovered her through a charity video contest and brought her to Los Angeles to audition for the role. Casting director Rachel Sutton has stated that Cravalho was the last person to audition out of hundreds of actresses.

In February 2017, it was announced that she had been cast in the pilot for the NBC drama Rise, which was ordered to series on May 4, 2017. The series premiered on March 13, 2018, but NBC cancelled the series on May 15, 2018, due to low ratings.

In May 2017, she sang the national anthem at the National Memorial Day Concert.

In November 2017, Cravalho announced she was going to reprise her role as Moana in the first Hawaiian-language dubbed Disney film. The dubbed Moana premiered on June 10, 2018.

On November 5, 2019, Cravalho portrayed Ariel in ABC's The Little Mermaid Live!, a live-action concert rendition of The Little Mermaid. In 2020, she starred in All Together Now, directed by Brett Haley for Netflix.

In 2020, Cravalho participated in Acting for a Cause, a live classic play and screenplay reading series created, directed and produced by Brando Crawford. Cravalho played Gwendolen Fairfax in The Importance of Being Earnest, Laertes in Hamlet, Lady Catherine in Pride and Prejudice, and Jeannie Bueller in Ferris Bueller's Day Off. The reading raised funds for non-profit charities including Mount Sinai Medical Center.

Cravalho was cast as the title character, Hailey, in the animated comedy-adventure series Hailey's On It!, which is slated to premiere in 2023.

Personal life 
In April 2020, Cravalho publicly came out as bisexual. In June 2021, Cravalho announced that she had been accepted into Columbia University and subsequently revealed that she planned to major in environmental science at the school.

Filmography

Film

Television

Video games

Stage

Music videos

Awards and nominations

See also 
Portuguese immigration to Hawaii

Notes

References

External links 

 

2000 births
Living people
Actresses from Hawaii
American child actresses
American child singers
American people of Native Hawaiian descent
Hawaii people of Portuguese descent
American film actresses
American television actresses
American voice actresses
Annie Award winners
Audiobook narrators
Bisexual actresses
Columbia University alumni
Hispanic and Latino American actresses
Hispanic and Latino American women singers
Kamehameha Schools alumni
LGBT Hispanic and Latino American people
LGBT Native Hawaiians
LGBT people from Hawaii
American LGBT people of Asian descent
Native Hawaiian actresses
Native Hawaiian musicians
People from Hawaii (island)
Walt Disney Records artists
20th-century American actresses
21st-century American actresses
20th-century American women singers
21st-century American women singers
21st-century American LGBT people
American bisexual actors
American people of Chinese descent
American people of Irish descent